Plestiodon liui is a species of lizard which is endemic to China.

References

liui
Reptiles of China
Endemic fauna of China
Reptiles described in 1989
Taxa named by Tsutomu Hikida
Taxa named by Zhao Ermi